The Munster Schools Junior Cup or  Munster Junior Cup is the under-age rugby union competition for schools affiliated to the Munster Branch of the IRFU with team members under 16 years of age.

The competition has been traditionally dominated by Cork city's major rugby playing schools C.B.C. with 19 titles  & P.B.C. claiming 30 titles. The County Tipperary school Rockwell College has won 20 titles, with the remaining titles (22 in all), won by Limerick schools, largely due to contributions from Crescent College & St. Munchin's with 7 victories respectively.

Top winners

Honours

1930s

 1932 Limerick CBS
 1933 Presentation Brothers College
 1934 Rockwell College beat Christian Brothers College
 1935 Rockwell College
 1936 Rockwell College
 1937 Rockwell College
 1938 Christian Brothers College
 1939 Mungret College

1940s

 1940 Mungret College beat Christian Brothers College
 1941 Mungret College
 1942 Rockwell College
 1943 Rockwell College
 1944 Presentation Brothers College
 1945 Presentation Brothers College beat Crescent College
 1946 Presentation Brothers College
 1947 Rockwell College
 1948 Rockwell College
 1949 Rockwell College

1950s

 1950 Crescent College
 1951 Presentation Brothers College beat Christian Brothers College
 1952 Crescent College
 1953 Christian Brothers College
 1954 Presentation Brothers College
 1955 Rockwell College
 1956 Rockwell College
 1957 Presentation Brothers College
 1958 Rockwell College
 1959 Rockwell College

1960s

 1960 Presentation Brothers College Beat Christian Brothers College
 1961 Crescent College beat Mungret College
 1962 Christian Brothers College
 1963 Presentation Brothers College
 1964 Presentation Brothers College beat Waterpark College
 1965 Presentation Brothers College beat Rockwell College
 1966 Presentation Brothers College beat St. Munchin's College
 1967 Rockwell College
 1968 Rockwell College beat St. Munchin's College
 1969 Christian Brothers College

1970s

 1970 St. Munchin's College beat Christian Brothers College
 1971 Christian Brothers College
 1972 Rockwell College
 1973 Presentation Brothers College
 1974 Rockwell College
 1975 Christian Brothers College
 1976 Presentation Brothers College
 1977 Presentation Brothers College
 1978 Christian Brothers College
 1979 Presentation Brothers College

1980s

 1980 Presentation Brothers College
 1981 Christian Brothers College beat Crescent College
 1982 Rockwell College beat Christian Brothers College 3-0 after a replay, drop goal by Peter O'Donoghue at outside centre deep in the second half. First match 0-0 at Thomond Park.
 1983 Presentation Brothers College beat Crescent College
 1984 Presentation Brothers College beat Rockwell College
 1985 Presentation Brothers College
 1986 Presentation Brothers College beat Crescent College 22-11
 1987 St. Munchin's College beat Crescent College10-3
 1988 Presentation Brothers College beat Crescent College
 1989 St. Munchin's College beat Crescent College

1990s

 1990 Christian Brothers College
 1991 Crescent College beat Christian Brothers College
 1992 Presentation Brothers College beat St. Munchin's College 3-0 after a replay in Thomond Park, drop goal by Ronan O'Gara with 5 minutes remaining in the second half. First match 0-0 at Musgrave Park. First PBC double since successive doubles in 1965 and 1966.
 1993 St. Munchin's College beat Presentation Brothers College
 1994 Christian Brothers College beat Presentation Brothers College
 1995 Presentation Brothers College beat Ardscoil Rís
 1996 Christian Brothers College beat St. Munchin's College
 1997 Rockwell College beat Crescent College 9-5
 1998 St. Munchin's College beat Presentation Brothers College
 1999 Christian Brothers College beat Rockwell College 32-0

2000s

 2000 Presentation Brothers College beat Christian Brothers College
 2001 Christian Brothers College beat Rockwell College
 2002 Presentation Brothers College beat Crescent College
 2003 Ardscoil Rís beat Presentation Brothers College
 2004 Christian Brothers College beat Ardscoil Rís
 2005 Ardscoil Rís defeated Christian Brothers College
 2006 Christian Brothers College beat St. Munchin's College
 2007 Presentation Brothers College beat Castletroy College
 2008 Castletroy College beat Presentation Brothers College 22-15
 2009 Presentation Brothers College beat St. Munchin's College 20-3

2010s

 2010 Crescent College defeated Christian Brothers College 17-13
 2011 Crescent College defeated Ard Scoil Ris 22-3
 2012 Christian Brothers College defeated Ard Scoil Ris 18 - 6 
 2013 Castletroy College defeated Crescent College 13-7
 2014  Presentation Brothers College defeated Crescent College 17-12
 2015 Christian Brothers College defeated Crescent College 22-10
 2016Crescent College defeated Christian Brothers College 17-7
 2017Christian Brothers College defeated Crescent College 21-19
 2018 St Munchins College defeated Christian Brothers College 15-10
2019 Rockwell College defeated St Munchins College 23-12

2020s

 2020 St Munchins College & Christian Brothers College Shared due to Global Pandemic
 2022  Presentation Brothers College defeated Christian Brothers College 14-10

Notes

References

External links
Munster Schools Rugby - official website

High school rugby union competitions in Ireland
Rugby union competitions in Munster
1932 establishments in Ireland